Mikhail Viktorovich Kharin (born 17 June 1976) is a Russian professional football coach and a former player.

International career
Kharin represented Russia at the 1995 FIFA World Youth Championship and the 1998 UEFA European Under-21 Championship.

Personal life
He is the younger brother of Dmitri Kharine and father of Filipp Kharin.

External links
 

1976 births
Footballers from Moscow
Living people
Russian footballers
Russia under-21 international footballers
Russia youth international footballers
Russian Premier League players
FC Torpedo Moscow players
FC Torpedo-2 players
Association football goalkeepers
Russian football managers
FC Torpedo Vladimir players